The R173 road is a regional road in Ireland, running its full length in County Louth. It loops around Cooley Peninsula, mainly along the coast. It nearly encircles the Cooley Mountains.  

It starts at a roundabout at Ballymascanlan, just north of Dundalk, where it meets the N52 and the M1/N1 roads.   
It then heads east, along the northern coast of Dundalk Bay to The Bush where it veers north, past the village of Grange to Carlingford.
From there it heads NW along the southern shore of Carlingford Lough, through the village of Omeath to the Northern Ireland border where it becomes the B79 into Newry, County Down. 

The R173 is a former Trunk Road and was previously numbered as the T62.

See also
Roads in Ireland
National primary road
National secondary road

References
Roads Act 1993 (Classification of Regional Roads) Order 2006 – Department of Transport

Regional roads in the Republic of Ireland
Roads in County Louth